This is a timeline documenting the events of heavy metal in the year 2010.

Bands disbanded
 Abscess
 Acheron
 The Autumn Offering
 Despised Icon
 Destroy the Runner
 Detente
 Dio
 Fear My Thoughts
 Fellsilent
 Finch
 Gwen Stacy
 Heaven & Hell
 Isis
 Luna Mortis
 Narnia
 The Number Twelve Looks Like You
 Red Harvest
 Revolution Renaissance
 Salt the Wound
 Theatre of Tragedy
 Wrench in the Works
 Xasthur
 Zyklon

Bands reformed
 Abruptum
Acheron
 Autopsy
 Battleaxe
 Coroner
 Empyrium
 Exhumed
 Godflesh
 Lord Belial
Lock Up
 Morgoth
 Murderdolls
 Nightfall
 Quiet Riot
 Salt the Wound
 Sanctuary
 Soundgarden
 Tokyo Blade
 Voivod
 Wastefall

Bands formed
Deafheaven
Esprit D'Air

Books
 Cult of Luna released a book explaining the full story behind their Eternal Kingdom album. The book is written in Swedish and translated into English, and the hardcover includes an audiobook.

Events
 Slayer frontman/bassist Tom Araya to undergo back surgery.
Emperor Magus Caligula, B-Force and Dominator all Quit Dark Funeral.
 Rush inducted into Canadian Songwriters Hall of Fame 2010.
 Mayhem Festival 2010 will tour through North America from July through August. The third annual tour will be co-headlined by Korn and Rob Zombie.
 Guitarist Jani Stefanovic quits Solution .45.
 Scorpions announce that they will retire after touring in support of final album Sting in the Tail.
 AC/DC headline Download Festival, marking their return to Donington for the first time in 19 years, since 1991's Monsters of Rock. Also Rage Against the Machine and Aerosmith to headline.
 In Flames founding member Jesper Strömblad quits the band after 17 years due to personal problems in February.
 Original Megadeth bassist Dave Ellefson rejoins the band after departing in 2002.
 Mike Portnoy of Dream Theater joins Avenged Sevenfold after the death of The Rev, to record their fifth studio album Nightmare. The results of The Rev's toxicology reports were released in June 2010, which revealed the cause of death as an accidental overdose of prescription drugs.
 Rammstein is banned from Belarus by the Council for Morality due to their "violence, masochism, homosexuality and other abnormalities".
 US death metal band The Famine's studio burnt down, along with their gear and recorded material for their upcoming 2010 release.
Behemoth frontman Adam "Nergal" Darski came to court over the Bible ripping incident in 2007, and was found not guilty on the basis that "The defendant's behaviour wasn’t recognised as a crime"
Textures parts ways with their keyboardist Richard Rietdijk to pursue other musical interests.
 On April 14, Type O Negative front-man Peter Steele death at age 48.
 The Human Abstract replace former lead singer Nathan Ells with Travis Richter (The Color of Violence, ex-From First to Last) and founding guitarist A.J. Minette returns.
Judas Priest won the 2010 Grammy Award for Best Metal Performance of "Dissident Aggressor."
Debauchery frontman Thomas "The Bloodbeast" Gurrath was fired from his job as a philosophy trainee teacher at a high school in Stuttgart, Germany for being in a death metal band."
 Anthrax reunite with former singer Joey Belladonna after his previous departure in 2007.
The first ever Sri Lankan metal documentary Arise - The Sri Lankan Metal Music Documentary was officially screened on 15 May 2010 at Alliance Française de Colombo, Sri Lanka.
Ronnie James Dio died of stomach cancer at the age of 67 on May 16, 2010.
Bay Area Metal legend Debbie Abono died of cancer at age 80, also on May 16, 2010.
Ozzfest returns with bands such as Ozzy Osbourne, Mötley Crüe, Rob Halford and DevilDriver on the bill.
Arsis re-joined by former bassist Noah Martin.
Westboro Baptist Church plans to picket the Ronnie James Dio Memorial Service at The Hall of Liberty in Forest Lawn Hollywood Hills.
 On May 25, Slipknot bassist Paul Gray dies at age 38.
 Ratt were forced to cancel their European tour due to Stephen Pearcy to undergo emergency hernia surgery.
 On June 16, "The Big Four of Thrash Metal", Anthrax, Megadeth, Slayer and Metallica, played together for the first time at the Sonisphere Festival at Bemowo Airport in Warsaw, Poland.
 The second event of Heavy MTL will be held in Montreal July 24 and 25, with bands such as Slayer, Testament, Megadeth, Halford, Alice Cooper, and Avenged Sevenfold.
 Early Graves vocalist Makh Daniels died in an automobile accident on August 1, 2010. The Funeral Pyre guitarist Justin Garcia fell asleep behind the wheel, and was taken with guitarist Tyler Jensen to the hospital with non-life-threatening injuries.
 Fear Factory members narrowly avoid bus fire. The cause of the fire was the rear-wheel catching fire, but luckily their trailer was left unscathed.
 Death of Desire vocalist Dawn Desirée was kidnapped by unknown members of a promotion agency, and guitarist Morbid was assaulted.
 Reunited Byzantine return without Tony Rohrbough, and introduce Brian Henderson as their new lead-guitarist.
 Behemoth frontman Adam "Nergal" Darski is hospitalized due to advanced stage leukemia. Behemoth subsequently cancels all remaining summer festivals, and their Russian, Baltic States, and US tour. Adam "Nergal" Darski underwent a bone marrow transplant surgery, and is currently recovering.
 Acid Reign announce they will be re-mastering and re-issuing their albums, by legendary producer Bill Metoyer who has worked with such bands as Slayer, Dirty Rotten Imbeciles, Corrosion of Conformity and Sacred Reich.
 X Japan are planning a North American tour after both Otakon and Lollapalooza, visiting Canada and the United States.
 After 25 years, Mike Portnoy leaves Dream Theater on September 8, 2010.
 Ari Nissilä, Toni Kansanoja, Kari Vähäkuopus, and Mikko Nevanlahti all leave Catamenia on October 4, 2010.
Sweet Savage founding guitarist Trevor Fleming died on October 2.
 Gotthard singer Steve Lee dies on October 5, 2010.
 The Autumn Offering parts ways with guitarist Tommy Church on November 1, 2010.
 Queensrÿche survive a bomb attack in Iraq while playing to the American troops.
 Armando Acosta, the ex-drummer of Saint Vitus died on November 25.
 King Diamond underwent a successful triple-bypass surgery on November 29.
 Avenged Sevenfold parts ways with former Dream Theater drummer Mike Portnoy.

Films
 MVD Visual and Sexy Intellectual will release a documentary DVD about Rage Against the Machine on February 23. The film is titled Revolution in the Head: Rage Against the Machine and the Art of Protest.
 Industrial metal act Ministry will release their film Fix: The Ministry Movie in 2010.
 Mathawaada Chithrapata will release the first Sri Lankan metal music documentary titled Arise – The Sri Lankan Metal Music Documentary showcasing the lives and the reasons behind the Sri Lankan metal music scene.
 Metallica, Anthrax, Slayer, and Megadeth will release The Big 4 DVD Box Set on November 2, featuring footage of all the bands' live sets from the Big 4 tour.

Albums released
All releases are studio albums unless otherwise noted. The most successful metal album released in 2010 was Iron Maiden's The Final Frontier, topping the charts in 28 countries. It was also No. 1 in Metal Hammer's list of '50 Greatest albums of 2010'.

January

February

March

April

May

June

July

August

September

October

November

December

References

External links
 About.com: Heavy Metal

2010s in heavy metal music
Metal